The Kent Institute of Art & Design (KIAD, often ) was an art school based across three campuses in the county of Kent, in the United Kingdom. It was formed by the amalgamation of three independent colleges: Canterbury College of Art, Maidstone College of Art and Rochester (Medway) College of Art. In turn KIAD merged with the Surrey Institute of Art & Design, University College on 1 August 2005 to form the University College for the Creative Arts at Canterbury, Epsom, Farnham, Maidstone and Rochester. In 2008, this gained full university status and became the University for the Creative Arts.

KIAD offered further education, higher education, postgraduate and part-time courses at three campuses, in Canterbury, Maidstone and Rochester.

History

Maidstone College of Art was founded in 1867, and Rochester College of Art in 1886. The origin of Canterbury College of Art lies in the private art school founded by the Victorian animal painter Thomas Sidney Cooper in 1882, and known then as the Canterbury Sidney Cooper School of Art. After Cooper's death 1902 his art school continued until 1935 when it was taken over by the City of Canterbury Education Committee. The Education Committee took on all the assets and liabilities of the art school and until 1972 it remained housed in the building that had been Cooper's home and studio in the centre of Canterbury. It then moved to a new site on the New Dover Road.

Canterbury College of Art was by this time operating under the aegis of the newly reorganised Kent County Council, along with the art schools at Maidstone and Rochester. Ravensbourne College of Art located in Chislehurst was also in an informal relationship to these three, by virtue of being technically in the county of Kent, but under the administrative control of Bromley Borough Council rather than Kent County Council. It was the three colleges under the direct control of Kent County Council that went on to form KIAD in 1987.

The founding director of the Kent Institute was Peter I. Williams, an artist in his own right and former principal of the Lincoln School of Art and Medway College of Design, Rochester, who ran the institute from 1987 to 1996. He was instrumental in gathering the three art colleges together, but reframed from amalgamating them into one single campus because he recognised their individual cultural connections within their communities.

A notable feature of the Canterbury College of Art at this time was the number of former-Leeds College of Art tutors and students who started working there. This arose from Thomas Watt being made Head of Fine Art at Canterbury in 1968, Watt having previously been a teaching colleague of Harry Thubron at Leeds College of Art. Under Watt the radical Leeds teaching methods developed by Thubron were imported into Canterbury through the employment of other artists from Leeds, such as Stass Paraskos, Tom Pemberton and Dennis Creffield. Another key member of staff was Eric Hurren, who led the Foundation Course in Art and Design from 1963 to 1988.

The merger of institutions to create KIAD was not without controversy and was effectively imposed on Kent County Council by the central government's National Advisory Board for education. This was in spite of concerted opposition from the County Council, the colleges concerned, the local Member of Parliament, David Crouch, and a large number of figures in the art world at the time, who petitioned Parliament. In the government's original proposal the intention was to merge the colleges and then close at least one of them. The creation of KIAD was, effectively, a compromise solution that saw duplicate courses at the different sites closed, but the individual colleges themselves remained open.

One of the ironies of the history of Canterbury College of Art is that the original home of the art school, in Cooper's house, again became a place for teaching art in 2004 when another educational institution in the city, Canterbury Christ Church University, used the building to house its fine art faculty.

Notable alumni and staff

Students

 Wale Adeyemi, fashion designer
 Jal Patel, Published Author
 Charlie Adlard, comic book artist
 Justin Bere, architect
 Billy Childish, foundation 1977 (who was banned from the Rochester site at Fort Pitt in the Medway Towns in 1981 for publishing "obscene" poetry)
 Babette Cole, children's writer and illustrator
 Sharon Bennett, English illustrator, designer, artist and author
 John Copnall, abstract artist and teacher,
 Wendy Dagworthy OBE, fashion designer, Royal College of Art professor 
 Roger Dean, artist
 Marcus Dillistone, Royal premiered film director, music producer Athens 2004 Olympic opening and closing ceremonies
 Tracey Emin, 1999 Turner Prize nominee
 Clive Evans, known as "Clive", London couture designer of the 1960s 
 Lizzie Farey, wood artist
 Brian Froud, fantasy artist 
 Gordon Frickers, marine artist
 Lasse Gjertsen, videographer
 Jackie Hatfield, artist and writer
 Tony Hart, TV personality
 Bob Holness, broadcaster
 John Joseph Haldane, philosopher, broadcaster
Bryan Ingham, etcher, painter, sculptor
 Tony Kaye, director
 Timothy Edwards, cricketer
 Andrew Kötting, film maker, writer, artist
 Ástþór Magnússon, Icelandic businessman and peace activist, a perennial candidate for the office of President of Iceland.
 James Mayhew, writer and illustrator of children's books
 Karen Millen, fashion designer
 Bill Mitchell founder of site-specific theatre company Wildworks.
 Humphrey Ocean, artist
 Stass Paraskos, artist and founder of the Cyprus College of Art
 Jayne Parker, artist
 Toni del Renzio, artist and writer
 Zandra Rhodes, fashion designer
 David Shaw, painter, silk-screener, tutor
 Richard Spare, artist
 Stuckist artists: Charles Thomson, Bill Lewis, Philip Absolon, Charles Williams, Sanchia Lewis
 Julie Verhoeven, illustrator/artist and fashion designer
 Muriel Wood, children's book illustrator
 Ray Davies, musician

Staff

Tutors include: Ian Dury, Stephen Farthing, David Hall, A. L. Rees and David Hockney.

Artist Mike Chaplin was a technician in the early 1970s, and Quentin Crisp a model at Maidstone College.

References

External links
University for the Creative Arts website 

University for the Creative Arts
Education in Kent
History of Kent
Education in Canterbury
Borough of Maidstone
Education in Medway
Defunct universities and colleges in England